Horní Město is a municipality and village in Bruntál District in the Moravian-Silesian Region of the Czech Republic. It has about 800 inhabitants.

Administrative parts
Villages of Dobřečov, Rešov, Skály and Stříbrné Hory are administrative parts of Horní Město.

Etymology
The original German name Bergstadt means "mountain town". The Czech name was derived from the German name and means literally "mining town".

Geography
The municipality is located on the border between the Nízký Jeseník and Hrubý Jeseník mountain ranges. The Huntava Stream flows through the municipality.

History
The first written mention of Horní Město is from 1398, when a settlement called Hankštejn/Hangstein was located here. Silver mining in the area was first documented in 1402, later gold and non-ferrous metals were also mined. In 1580, a free imperial town was founded by Emperor Rudolf II and was named Bergstadt - Hangstein. Later the second part of the name was dropped.

From 1938 to 1945 it was annexed by Nazi Germany and administered as a part of Reichsgau Sudetenland. After the war,
the German population was expelled.

In the middle of the 20th century, the last gold was mined and only non-ferrous metals remained. Their mining ended in 1970.

Sights
The Church of Saint Mary Magdalene was built in 1611. It is decorated by valuable paintings from 1690.

References

External links

 

Villages in Bruntál District